The Nemesis is a Lotus Exige modified by British company Ecotricity. According to Dale Vince, the director of Ecotricity, the car was meant to "smash the boring, Noddy stereotype of the green car".

Design
The Nemesis used the chassis of a Lotus Exige bought off eBay. The petrol engine was removed and replaced with two electric motors and a new transmission. Battery packs were strategically placed and the air ducts on the original body were removed, as they are not needed for electric propulsion. The exterior was painted grey with black and white stripes. All the electricity the car used came from wind power produced by Ecotricity.

Speed Record 

External links 
 Interview with Dale Vince by Robert Llewellyn about the Nemisis in the Nemesis.

References 

Electric sports cars